Zale Dalen is a Canadian film and television director. He is known for the 1980 film The Hounds of Notre Dame, for which he garnered a Genie Award nomination for Best Director at the 2nd Genie Awards in 1981, the cult films Skip Tracer (1977) and Terminal City Ricochet (1990).

His television credits have included episodes of For the Record, The Edison Twins, Danger Bay, Airwolf, Wiseguy, The Beachcombers, Alfred Hitchcock Presents, 21 Jump Street, Kung Fu: The Legend Continues and Call of the Wild.  In addition he directed two made for TV movies: "Anything to Survive" (1990) for ABC and "On Thin Ice, the Tai Babalonia Story" (1990) for NBC.

His non-television work includes educational and sponsored films, plus the Saskatchewan Pavilion film for Expo '86.

Most recently, Jesse Savath, the son of the late writer/producer Phil Savath, has approached Zale Dalen seeking an option that would allow a remake of his first feature film, "Skip Tracer" (1976). Zale Dalen has granted that option. "Skip Tracer" won an Etrog, the Wendy Michener award for emerging directors at the Canadian Film Awards in 1977. It was presented at the Montreal, Toronto, New York, London, Moscow, Thesolonika (Greece), and Sidney (Australia) film festivals.

References

External links

Film directors from British Columbia
Canadian television directors
Living people
Year of birth missing (living people)